Solid-state lighting (SSL) is a type of lighting that uses semiconductor light-emitting diodes (LEDs), organic light-emitting diodes (OLED), or polymer light-emitting diodes (PLED) as sources of illumination rather than electrical filaments, plasma (used in arc lamps such as fluorescent lamps), or gas.

Solid state electroluminescence is used in SSL, as opposed to incandescent bulbs (which use thermal radiation) or fluorescent tubes. Compared to incandescent lighting, SSL creates visible light with reduced heat generation and less energy dissipation. Most common "white LEDs” convert blue light from a solid-state device to an (approximate) white light spectrum using photoluminescence, the same principle used in conventional fluorescent tubes.

The typically small mass of a solid-state electronic lighting device provides for greater resistance to shock and vibration compared to brittle glass tubes/bulbs and long, thin filament wires. They also eliminate filament evaporation, potentially increasing the life span of the illumination device.

Solid-state lighting is often used in traffic lights and is also used in modern vehicle lights, street and parking lot lights, train marker lights, building exteriors, remote controls etc. Controlling the light emission of LEDs may be done most effectively by using the principles of nonimaging optics. Solid-state lighting has made significant advances in industry. In the entertainment lighting industry, standard incandescent tungsten-halogen lamps are being replaced by solid-state lighting fixtures.



See also
L Prize
LED lamp
List of light sources
Smart lighting

References

Further reading
 
 Kho, Mu-Jeong, Javed, T., Mark, R., Maier, E., and David, C. (2008) 'Final Report: OLED Solid State Lighting: Kodak European Research' MOTI (Management of Technology and Innovation) Project, Judge Business School of the University of Cambridge and Kodak European Research, Final Report presented on 4 March 2008 at Kodak European Research at Cambridge Science Park, Cambridge, UK, pages 1–12.

External links

EUROPEAN METROLOGY RESEARCH PROJECT - METROLOGY FOR SOLID STATE LIGHTING
Solid State Lighting, International Energy Agency research project
DOE SSL roadmap
Lighting Research Center - Solid-State Lighting Program
 OLLA: finished European academic-industrial research project into OLED lighting
OLED100.EU: successor to the OLLA project

Types of lamp
Semiconductor devices
Energy-saving lighting
Light-emitting diodes